St. Mary's railway station was the intermediate railway station in Ramsey St Mary's, Cambridgeshire  on the Great Northern railway line running from Holme to Ramsey North. The former station is now demolished and a bungalow stands in its place. It closed to passengers on 6 October 1947, became an unstaffed siding from May 1960, with freight use until around 1971.

Route

References

External links
 St. Mary's station on navigable 1946 O. S. map
 St. Mary's station on Subterranea Britannica

Disused railway stations in Cambridgeshire
Former Great Northern Railway stations
Railway stations in Great Britain opened in 1863
Railway stations in Great Britain closed in 1947
Ramsey, Cambridgeshire